Lac de Kruth-Wildenstein is a lake in Haut-Rhin, France. At an elevation of 545 m, its surface area is 0.81 km².

Kruth Wildenstein
R Lac de KruthWildenstein